LLM Communications was a political lobbying firm founded in 1997 by Neal Lawson, Ben Lucas, and Jonathan Mendelsohn. It had 20 employees and 40 clients. In July 1998, LLM was reported to have saved Tesco £40 million by persuading ministers to abandon plans for a supermarket car-park tax. Lawson left the company at the end of 2004, having become "uneasy" with what "New Labour" was doing within six months of its 1997 election, but remaining long enough to ensure that it would survive. While working for LLM, Jonathan Mendelsohn was a spokesman and lobbyist for the gambling company PartyGaming.

References

External links
 LLM Communications webpage

British companies established in 1997
Mass media companies established in 1997
Public relations companies of the United Kingdom
Defunct companies based in London